Philippa of Clarence (16 August 1355 – 5 January 1382) was a medieval English princess and the suo jure Countess of Ulster.

Biography 
She was born at Eltham Palace in Kent on 16 August 1355, the only child of Lionel of Antwerp, 1st Duke of Clarence, and Elizabeth de Burgh, 4th Countess of Ulster. Her father was the third son, but the second son to survive infancy, of King Edward III of England and Philippa of Hainault. She was the eldest grandchild of King Edward and Queen Philippa, her namesake. 

Philippa married Edmund Mortimer, 3rd Earl of March, at the age of fourteen, in the Queen's Chapel at Reading Abbey, an alliance that would have far-reaching consequences in English history. Her cousin, King Richard II, remained childless, making Philippa and her descendants next in line to the throne until his deposition. In the Wars of the Roses, the Yorkist claim to the crown was based on descent from Edward III through Philippa, her son Roger Mortimer, and granddaughter Anne Mortimer, who married Richard of Conisburgh, 3rd Earl of Cambridge, a son of Edmund of Langley, 1st Duke of York.

Philippa died in 1382 and was buried at Wigmore Abbey, Herefordshire.

Marriage and issue
Her children with Edmund Mortimer were as follows:

Ancestry

Notes

References

 

 

1355 births
1382 deaths
People from Eltham
People from Herefordshire
14th-century English women
14th-century English people
Daughters of English dukes
Earls of Ulster (1264 creation)
Ulster
Heirs to the English throne
Ulster
Philippa
House of Burgh
Philippa